Kelly Robert Downs (born October 25, 1960) is an American former professional baseball pitcher, who played in Major League Baseball (MLB) for the San Francisco Giants and Oakland Athletics from 1986 to 1993. He wore uniform number 37 for his seven years with the Giants, and number 31 for his two seasons with the A's.

Downs won a career high 13 games in 1988 for the Giants and appeared in the 1989 World Series versus the Athletics. He was featured on the cover of Sports Illustrated on October 30, 1989, carrying his nephew in his arms after the Loma Prieta earthquake (magnitude 7.1) disrupted Game 3, at Candlestick Park.

Downs graduated from Viewmont High School in 1979.

His brother, Dave Downs, pitched briefly for the 1972 Philadelphia Phillies.

References

External links

Major League Baseball pitchers
San Francisco Giants players
Oakland Athletics players
Baseball players from Utah
1960 births
Living people
Oklahoma City 89ers players
Peninsula Pilots players
Phoenix Firebirds players
Portland Beavers players
Salt Lake Buzz players
San Jose Giants players
Spartanburg Phillies players